William VI may refer to:

 William VI, Duke of Aquitaine (1004–1038)
 William VI, Count of Auvergne (1096–1136)
 William VI of Montpellier (before 1120–after 1161)
 William VI, Marquess of Montferrat (c. 1173–1226)
 William II, Duke of Bavaria (died 1417), also William VI of Holland
 William the Younger, Duke of Brunswick-Lüneburg (1535–1592)
 William VI, Landgrave of Hesse-Kassel (or Hesse-Cassel) (1629–1663)
 William I of the Netherlands (1772–1843), also William VI of Orange